2013 is the second year for Super Fight League, an Indian-based mixed martial arts (MMA) league. Whilst the SFL began holding events from February 22 with their SFL Contenders event, which are untelevised events that take place in the SFL Training Centre as a way to build up the fighters before bringing forward to a television audience, the promotion made their televised return with SFL 14 on March 29, which was headlined by two title fights between Xavier Foupa-Pokam and John Troyer for the middleweight title, and Sanja Sucevic and Colleen Schneider for the women's flyweight title. The same event was also their first on ESPN Star Sports in India.

Super Fight League has scheduled several fights cards throughout 2013:

Event summaries

SFL 14
SFL 14 took place on March 29, 2013 in Mumbai, India. As with the previous events, it streamed live on YouTube and on the Fight Network in Canada. It was also the first event shown on STAR Sports in India. The Super Fight League rewarded 2 titles in the men's Middleweight and women's Flyweight divisions at this event.

Results

Sources

SFL 15
SFL 15 took place on April 12, 2013 in Mumbai, India. As with the previous events, it streamed live on YouTube and was shown on STAR Sports in India and on the Fight Network in Canada.

2012 London Olympics Freestyle Wrestling Silver medallist Sushil Kumar was in attendance as a commentator for this event.

Results

Sources

SFL 16
SFL 16 took place on April 26, 2013 in Mumbai, India. As with the previous events, it streamed live on YouTube, on STAR Sports in India and on the Fight Network in Canada.

Results

Sources

SFL 17
SFL 17 took place on May 10, 2013 in Mumbai, India. As with the previous events, it streamed live on YouTube, on STAR Sports in India and on the Fight Network in Canada.

Fight Card

Sources

SFL 18
SFL 18 took place on May 24, 2013 in Mumbai, India. As with the previous events, it was streamed live on YouTube, on STAR Sports in India and on the Fight Network in Canada.

Fight Card

Sources

SFL 19
SFL 19 took place on June 7, 2013 in Mumbai, India. As with the previous events, it was streamed live on YouTube, on STAR Sports in India and on the Fight Network in Canada.

Fight Card

Sources

SFL 20-21
On August 3, 2013, the Super Fight League hosted SFL 22 and SFL 23 on the same night, with their televised dates taking place one week after the other, as SFL 20 will air on August 9, and SFL 21 will air on August 16. The first four fights of the event will be considered SFL 20, and the later half of the event's fights will be SFL 21. This event will be the first to take place under the SFL's latest format and newly created 800-seat arena.

SFL 20
SFL 20 will air on August 9, 2013 in Mumbai, India. As with the previous events, it will stream on YouTube, on STAR Sports in India and on the Fight Network in Canada.

Fight Card

Sources

SFL 21
SFL 21 will air on August 16, 2013 in Mumbai, India. As with the previous events, it will stream on YouTube, on STAR Sports in India and on the Fight Network in Canada.

Fight Card

Sources

SFL 22-23
On August 17, 2013, the Super Fight League will host SFL 22 and SFL 23 on the same night, with their televised dates taking place one week after the other, with SFL 22 airing on August 23, and SFL 23 airing on August 30.

SFL 22
SFL 22 will air on August 23, 2013 in Mumbai, India. As with the previous events, it will stream on YouTube, on STAR Sports in India and on the Fight Network in Canada.

Fight Card

Sources

SFL 23
SFL 23 will air on August 30, 2013 in Mumbai, India. As with the previous events, it will stream on YouTube, on STAR Sports in India and on the Fight Network in Canada.

Fight Card

Sources

SFL 24-25
On August 31, 2013, the Super Fight League will host SFL 24 and SFL 25 on the same night, with their televised dates taking place one week after the other, with SFL 24 airing on September 6, and SFL 25 airing on September 13.

SFL 24
SFL 24 will air on September 6, 2013 in Mumbai, India. As with the previous events, it will stream on YouTube, on STAR Sports in India and on the Fight Network in Canada.

Fight Card

Sources

SFL 25
SFL 25 will air on September 13, 2013 in Mumbai, India. As with the previous events, it will stream on YouTube, on STAR Sports in India and on the Fight Network in Canada.

Fight Card

Sources

SFL 26-27
On September 14, 2013, the Super Fight League will host SFL 26 and SFL 27 on the same night, with their televised dates taking place one week after the other, with SFL 26 airing on September 20, and SFL 27 airing on September 27.

SFL 26
SFL 26 will air on September 20, 2013 in Mumbai, India. As with the previous events, it will stream on YouTube, on STAR Sports in India and on the Fight Network in Canada.

Fight Card

Sources

SFL 27
SFL 27 will air on September 27, 2013 in Mumbai, India. As with the previous events, it will stream on YouTube, on STAR Sports in India and on the Fight Network in Canada.

Fight Card

Sources

SFL 28-29
On September 28, 2013, the Super Fight League will host SFL 28 and SFL 29 on the same night, with their televised dates taking place one week after the other, with SFL 28 airing on October 4, and SFL 29 airing on October 11.

SFL 28
SFL 28 will air on October 4, 2013 in Mumbai, India. As with the previous events, it will stream on YouTube, on STAR Sports in India and on the Fight Network in Canada.

Fight Card

Sources

SFL 29
SFL 29 will air on October 11, 2013 in Mumbai, India. As with the previous events, it will stream on YouTube, on STAR Sports in India and on the Fight Network in Canada.

Fight Card

Sources

SFL 30-31
On October 12, 2013, the Super Fight League will host SFL 30 and SFL 31 on the same night, with their televised dates taking place one week after the other, with SFL 30 airing on October 18, and SFL 31 airing on October 25.

SFL 30
SFL 30 will air on October 18, 2013 in Mumbai, India. As with the previous events, it will stream on YouTube, on STAR Sports in India and on the Fight Network in Canada.

Fight Card

Sources

SFL 31
SFL 31 will air on October 25, 2013 in Mumbai, India. As with the previous events, it will stream on YouTube, on STAR Sports in India and on the Fight Network in Canada.

Fight Card

Sources

SFL 32-33
On October 26, 2013, the Super Fight League will host SFL 32 and SFL 33 on the same night, with their televised dates taking place one week after the other, with SFL 32 airing on November 1, and SFL 33 airing on November 8.

SFL 32
SFL 32 will air on November 1, 2013 in Mumbai, India. As with the previous events, it will stream on YouTube, on STAR Sports in India and on the Fight Network in Canada.

Fight Card

Sources

SFL 33
SFL 33 will air on November 8, 2013 in Mumbai, India. As with the previous events, it will stream on YouTube, on STAR Sports in India and on the Fight Network in Canada.

Background

The main event featured a Champion vs. Champion fight as the current SFL World Lightweight Champion Pawan Maan Singh challenged the current SFL World Welterweight Champion Shyam Prasad for Prasad's Welterweight Title.

Fight Card

Sources

SFL 34
SFL 34 took place on November 15, 2013 in Mumbai, India. As with the previous events, it will stream on YouTube, on STAR Sports in India and on the Fight Network in Canada.

Background

Fight Card

Sources

See also
 Super Fight League
 2013 in SFL Contenders events

References

External links
 Super Fight League official site

SFL
Mixed martial arts events